Fathoms Deep is the third album by English singer Linda Lewis, released in 1973.

Track listing
All tracks composed by Linda Lewis; except where indicated

Side One
"Fathoms Deep" - (Linda Lewis, Jim Cregan)
"I'm in Love Again" 
"Red Light Ladies" 
"If I Could" 
"Kingman-Tinman" 
"Lullabye"

Side Two
"Play Around" 
"Wise Eyes" 
"Guffer" 
"Goodbye Joanna" 
"On the Stage" 
"Moles"

2012 Re-master CD bonus tracks
"Sideway Shuffle"  - (single)
"Safe and Sound" - (Linda Lewis, Jim Cregan) - (B-side of "Sideway Shuffle")
"Red Light Ladies" (acoustic demo)

The remastered and expanded CD has the tracks in a different order (as set by Linda herself). "Play Around" was not originally planned to be on the album so it gets moved down the order.

Personnel
Domino, Poli Palmer - backing vocals
Danny Thompson - double bass
Clive Chaman, Phil Chen - bass guitar
Conrad Isidore, Richard Bailey - drums
Bob Tench, Lowell George, Robert Ahwai - guitar
Jim Cregan, Linda Lewis - guitar, vocals
Max Middleton, Steve Gregory - keyboards
Allan Sharpe, Larry Steel - percussion
Chris Mercer, Mick Eve - saxophone
Ron Carthy - trumpet
Poli Palmer - woodwind
Del Newman - string and brass arrangements, conductor

References
The Guinness Book of British Hit Albums, fifth edition, 1992
http://www.allmusic.com/album/fathoms-deep-mw0000794065
http://www.discogs.com/Linda-Lewis-Fathoms-Deep/release/1780207
original record sleeve notes
Sleeve notes for 2012 BBR remaster / re-issue

1973 albums
Linda Lewis albums
Reprise Records albums